Vuk Kalaitović (1913—1948) was a Yugoslav military officer holding the rank of captain who was commander of the Chetnik Mileševa Corps during World War II.

World War II

Anti-Axis uprising in Serbia 
Kalaitović became active in resistance to Axis occupation of Yugoslavia in August 1941. On 25 August, together with units of voivode Đekić and Vlajko Ćurčić (voivode of Zlatar) he participated in capture of Axis controlled Kokin Brod when all members of its garrison were killed. His deputy was Borislav Mirković.

Kalaitović almost certainly participated in the Battle of Nova Varoš on 5 September 1941.

Establishment of the Mileševa Corps 
On 29 October 1941 Kalaitović attended the gathering of people from villages Štitkovo, Božetić and Bukovik, organized by Chetnik officer Božo Javorski. In February 1942 joint forces of Chetniks under command of Kalaitović and Muslim militia commanded by Hasan Zvizdić attacked the Communist forces. Originally Kalaitović was under command of Chetnik commander Miloš Glišić, who worked both for the German-appointed puppet Government of National Salvation and for the Chetniks of Draža Mihailović. After Glišić was arrested by Gestapo in Autumn of 1942 the organization of the Chetnik units in valley of the river Lim was changed, based on the initiative of Pavle Đurišić, and Mileševa Corp was established.

Participation in Đurišić's raids of revenge 

On January 5, 1943, Montenegrin Chetniks, commanded by Pavle Đurišić, attacked 33 villages predominantly populated with Muslims in the region of Lower Bihor. They pursued raids of revenge against Sandžak Muslims, many being innocent villagers, with the goal of settling accounts with Muslim militias.

In February 1943, Chetnik units commanded by Kalaitović, together with those commanded by Ostojić, Baćović, Đurišić and Lukačević killed about 1,200 Muslim Militiamen and about 8,000 women, children and old people. In just one village, Kasidoli near Priboj, Kalaitović's troops killed 227 Muslims, most of whom were killed either by cold weapons or by being burnt alive in their homes.

Anti-partisan terror 
In June of 1943. Kalaitović ordered killing of 12 prominent pro-partisan villagers in Bistrica near Nova Varoš. Another crime in Bistrica by Kalaitović's Chetniks happened in October of same year, when they killed 5 members of same family and burnt down 45 houses of partisan supporters. In June of 1944. 17 citizens of Nova Varoš and near by villages were executed by Mileševa Corps.

Retreating with Đurišić toward Slovenia through Bosnia 
Mileševa Corp with 200 men at that time commanded by Kalaitović joined retreating units of Pavle Đurišić at the end of 1944. On 16 December 1944 his units were ambushed near Miljevina and suffered substantial casualties that left him unable for further actions.

The Chetnik units were restructured against the order published on 5 January 1945, but Mileševa Corps remained non-restructured and under command of Kalaitović and among other Chetnik units of Chetnik HQ for Montenegro, Boka and Old Ras. Kalaitović and his units participated in the Battle of Lijevče Field.

Leaving Đurišić and return to Štitkovo 
After the battle, Kalaitović and group of his Chetniks retreated from the region of Banja Luka with intention to return to Sanjak region. They left Đurišić on 9 April 1945.

Kalaitović was one of Chetnik commanders who survived defeat of Chetnik forces on Zelengora on 13 May 1945.

After the war Kalaitović lead a unit of outlaws, who were responsible for killing 31 people, mostly civilians. Kalaitović died in January of 1948, in a fight with Yugoslav police.

Legacy 
In 2010 a monument dedicated to Kalaitović was placed in the village of Štitkovo on the Kalaitović family estate. Serbian historian Salih Selimović states that Kalaitović protected the Muslim population and never attacked any of Muslim localities within the zone of his responsibility. When, during 1945, Communist authorities discovered that Kalaitović was hiding in the village of Kladnica, they blocked the area, but Muslim villagers helped Kalaitović to hide and escape. Serbian historian Dubravka Stojanović objected to the monument in Štitkovo  because Kalaitović's units did commit war crimes.
In 2013 a memorial plaque to 108 Chetniks who died in the World War II was placed in Štitkovo.

References

Sources 

 
 
 
 
 
 

1913 births
1948 deaths
Serbian people of World War II
Chetnik personnel of World War II
Serbian anti-communists
People shot dead by law enforcement officers
Serbian mass murderers